The 2017 Youngstown State Penguins football team represented Youngstown State University in the 2017 NCAA Division I FCS football season. They were led by third-year head coach Bo Pelini and played their home games at Stambaugh Stadium. They were a member of the Missouri Valley Football Conference. They finished the season 6–5, 4–4 in MVFC play to finish in a three-way tie for fifth place.

Schedule

Source: Schedule

Game summaries

at Pittsburgh

Robert Morris

Central Connecticut

South Dakota State

at South Dakota

North Dakota State

at Northern Iowa

Illinois State

at Indiana State

at Southern Illinois

Missouri State

Ranking movements

References

Youngstown State
Youngstown State Penguins football seasons
Youngstown State Penguins football